Lee Stickland is a former football (soccer) player who represented New Zealand at international level.

Stickland played two official A-international matches for the New Zealand in 1980, the first a 2–0 win over Fiji on 21 February, the second as a substitute in a 6–1 win over Solomon Islands on 29 February.

References

External links

Year of birth missing (living people)
Living people
Manurewa AFC players
New Zealand association footballers
New Zealand international footballers
Association football defenders
1980 Oceania Cup players